Trueman is a surname of English origin, and may refer to

Albert William Trueman (1902–1988), Canadian educator and administrator
Arthur Elijah Trueman (1894–1956), English geologist 
Bert Trueman (1882–1961), English footballer
Brian Trueman (born 1932), British writer and broadcaster 
Fred Trueman (1931–2006), British cricketer
Inez Trueman (1917–2015), Canadian politician
Mark Trueman (born 1988), English football manager and former player
Peter Trueman (1934–2021), Canadian television and radio personality
Stuart Trueman (1911–1995), Canadian author and journalist
Carl Trueman (bron 1967), English professor and theologian

Fictional
Martin Trueman, fictional villain from The Sarah Jane Adventures
Patrick Trueman, fictional character from EastEnders
Paul Trueman, fictional character from EastEnders
Yolande Trueman, fictional character from EastEnders

See also 
Truman (surname)